Packet concatenation is a computer networking optimization that coalesces multiple packets under a single header. The use of packet containment reduces the overhead at the physical and link layers.

See also
 Frame aggregation
 Packet aggregation

References

Computer networking
Packets (information technology)